The Orang Sungei (Malay word for "River People") are a group of indigenous people native to the state of Sabah, Malaysia. Groups of communities live along the rivers of Kinabatangan, Paitan, Labuk, Kudat, Membakut and Lahad Datu. The name "Orang Sungei" is a collective term that was first coined during the colonial British rule for communities living along the Kinabatangan River. In some cases like the Tambanuo people would refer to themselves as Orang Sungei for those who are Muslims; unless if they are not Muslims, then they would identify themselves by their tribal name. Whereas tribes like the Ida'an people are sometimes regarded as part of the Orang Sungei historically because of their common linguistic origins.

Notable Orang Sungai
 Bung Moktar Radin, Deputy Chief Minister of Sabah member of Parliament for Kinabatangan
 Salam Bin Togiran, Ops Daulat fallen hero in 2013 Kinabatangan
 Bolkiah Ismail , former Minister of Sabah.
 Ronald Kiandee , Malaysian Minister.
 Abdul Rahim Bakri, The former deputy of Malaysian Minister.

See also
 Tambanuo

References

External links
 Profile from SabahTourism.com

Ethnic groups in Sabah
Kadazan-Dusun people